The Constitutional Union is a political party in Morocco aligned with the ruling monarchy. The party has a history of cooperating with two other parties with a liberal orientation, the National Rally of Independents and the Popular Movement, since 1993.

History
The grouping was founded by then Prime Minister Maati Bouabid in 1983 and favoured by King Hassan II. In the 1984 parliamentary election, it won the greatest number of seats, but remained far from an absolute majority. Later it became an ordinary party without a special role in Morocco's multi-party system.

The party is a full member of Liberal International, which it joined at the latter's Dakar Congress in 2003. Its electoral symbol is a horse.

In the parliamentary election held on 27 September 2002, the party won 16 out of 325 seats. In the next parliamentary election, held on 7 September 2007, the party won 27 out of 325 seats. The party won 23 out of 325 seats in the parliamentary election held in November 2011, being the seventh party in the parliament.

Electoral results

Moroccan Parliament

References

1983 establishments in Morocco
Conservative liberal parties
Conservative parties in Africa
Liberal conservative parties
Liberal International
Liberal parties in Morocco
Monarchist parties
Political parties established in 1983
Political parties in Morocco